Minoria is an indie Metroidvania game developed by Brazilian studio Bombservice and published by DANGEN Entertainment. It was released on August 27, 2019 for Windows, and on September 10, 2020 for PlayStation 4, Xbox One and Nintendo Switch. It is a spiritual sequel to the Momodora series with 2.5D graphics. It has a similar gothic horror tone as Momodora: Reverie Under the Moonlight and revolves around warrior nuns who are sent into the ruins of the Kingdom of Ramezia to free Princesses who were kidnapped by heretical witches. The game received mixed reviews from critics, who praised it for its combat mechanics and graphics, but criticized it for its "uneven" quality and short length.

Plot 
The game revolves around two nuns, the main character, Sister Semilla, and her companion Sister Fran. They are sent into the ruins of the Kingdom of Ramezia to rescue Princesses who were captured by heretical witches.

Reception 

The game received an aggregate score of 73/100 on Metacritic for the PC version, indicating "mixed or average" reviews.

Ollie Reynolds of Nintendo Life rated the game's Switch version 8/10, saying that they would "hate to see [it] slip under the radar". Calling the game's combat "impressive" and better than games such as Bloodstained: Ritual of the Night, the battles with witches were praised as most exciting. However, they criticized the environmental design, saying it was "rather samey" and easy to get lost.

Elizabeth Henges of RPG Site rated the game's PC version 7/10, saying that the game was "solid", but criticizing certain aspects of combat such as the lack of hit stun compared to Momodora 4. Calling the game "far from perfect", she nevertheless said that she was excited for a sequel that fixed the issues and made it more polished.

Chris Carter of Destructoid rated the game 6/10, saying it was not "quite as on point" as Momodora 4, but that it was still "mostly worth exploring". Calling the combat "very smooth", he criticized the "wonkier" spell system and the map system having no room for manual marking. Calling it an "uneven game", he nevertheless stated that "it just shows the world how talented Bombservice really is".

References 

2019 video games
Indie video games
Windows games
PlayStation 4 games
Nintendo Switch games
Xbox One games
Single-player video games
Metroidvania games
Nuns in fiction
Video games about witchcraft
Video games about religion
Video games developed in Brazil
Video games featuring female protagonists
Gothic video games